Smuts is an unincorporated community within the Rural Municipality of Grant No. 372, in the province of Saskatchewan, Canada. Smuts is located west of Highway 41 north of Vonda, at coordinates (52.435649595032864, -106.1133531092357).

See also

 List of communities in Saskatchewan

References

External links

Grant No. 372, Saskatchewan
Unincorporated communities in Saskatchewan
Division No. 15, Saskatchewan